Gmina Bobrowniki may refer to either of the following rural administrative districts in Poland:
Gmina Bobrowniki, Silesian Voivodeship
Gmina Bobrowniki, Kuyavian-Pomeranian Voivodeship